Parvatibai Athavale (1870 – 1955) was a close associate of Dr. Dhondo Keshav Karve, one of India's great social reformers. She made major contributions in social upliftment of women, particularly Hindu widows.

Parvatibai Athavale was born in 1870 in Devrukh, a small town in Kokan region on the west coast of India. Her maiden name was Miss Krishna Joshi. She was married at the young age of eleven with Mr. Mahadev Narayan Athavale. She gave birth to three children after her marriage but only one son (Mr. Narayan Mahadev Athavale) survived.

Later in her life, Parvatibai went to the U.S. to collect funds and donations for the widow education and upliftment, in associated with Karve. She herself became a widow early in life and had to shave off her head and stopped wearing any jewellery and took on the traditional dress of a Maharashtrian Brahmin widow, as was the tradition during those times. After working in the Widows Home, Parvatibai realised that if a change had to come, it had to be initiated by the widows themselves and to set an example, she decided to discard the signs of widowhood. In 1912, she stopped shaving her head and gave up her widow's garb.  She says she was criticized a lot, but she did not give in to those insults.

Parvatibai Athavale has also penned down her autobiography, later translated in English by Justin E. Abbott and published in 1930, by the name of My Story: The Autobiography of a Hindu Widow, which makes a social impact even today.

References

Indian humanitarians
Indian autobiographers
Indian women non-fiction writers
Women autobiographers
Women writers from Maharashtra